Jonathan Erlich and Andy Ram won in the final 6–3, 7–6(7–4) against Andrew Kratzmann and Jarkko Nieminen.

Seeds

  Jeff Coetzee /  Chris Haggard (first round)
  Rick Leach /  Brian MacPhie (first round)
  Andrew Kratzmann /  Jarkko Nieminen (final)
  Jonathan Erlich /  Andy Ram (champions)

Draw

External links
 2003 Thailand Open Doubles Draw

Doubles
Thailand Open - Doubles
 in Thai tennis